Aeromachus dubius, the dingy scrub-hopper, is a butterfly belonging to the family Hesperiidae. It ranges from India to China, including Malaya, Assam, Myanmar, Laos, Vietnam, Hainan and Yunnan.

Description

The larva (caterpillar) has been recorded on Cyrtococcum trigonum.

Cited references

See also
Hesperiidae
List of butterflies of India (Hesperiinae)
List of butterflies of India (Hesperiidae)

References

 
 
 Tree of Life Web Project .
 

d
Butterflies described in 1897
Butterflies of Asia